Zenk is a surname. Notable people with the surname include:

Colleen Zenk (born 1953), American actress
Hans-Joachim Zenk (born 1952), German sprinter
Tom Zenk (born 1958), American professional wrestler and bodybuilder

See also
 Menk (surname)
 Zenke